Antonio Valentin Sefer (born 22 April 2000) is a Romanian professional footballer who plays as a winger for Liga I club Rapid București.

Club career
On 20 February 2019, Sefer signed a four-and-half-year contract with Rapid București.

International career
Sefer was selected in Romania's team for the football tournament at the 2020 Summer Olympics.

Career statistics

Club

International

Honours
Rapid București
Liga III: 2018–19

References

External links

Antonio Sefer at LPF.ro 

2000 births
Living people
Sportspeople from Galați
Romanian footballers
Romania youth international footballers
Romania under-21 international footballers
Association football defenders
Liga I players
Liga II players
Liga III players
FC Rapid București
ASC Oțelul Galați players
Romanian expatriate footballers
Romanian expatriate sportspeople in the Netherlands
Expatriate footballers in the Netherlands
Footballers at the 2020 Summer Olympics
Olympic footballers of Romania